Adrian David Griffiths (born 27 November 1959) is a former Welsh cricketer.  Griffiths was a right-handed batsman who bowled right-arm fast-medium.  He was born in Carmarthen, Carmarthenshire.

Griffiths made his debut for Wales Minor Counties in the 1990 MCCA Knockout Trophy against Shropshire.  He played Minor counties cricket for Wales Minor Counties from 1990 to 1996, which included 39 Minor Counties Championship matches and eight MCCA Knockout Trophy matches. In 1993, he made his List A debut against Sussex, in the NatWest Trophy.  He played a further List A match for the team, against Middlesex in the 1994 NatWest Trophy. In his two List A matches, he scored six runs, while with the ball he took four wickets at a bowling average of 21.75, with best figures of 3/57.

References

External links
Adrian Griffiths at ESPNcricinfo
Adrian Griffiths at CricketArchive

1959 births
Living people
Cricketers from Carmarthen
Welsh cricketers
Wales National County cricketers